Paula Todd is a Canadian multimedia journalist, investigative author, broadcaster, and lawyer. She is a professor in the School of Media at Seneca College, and is a frequent speaker on cyberabuse, Internet culture, writing, reporting, literacy and freedom of the press.

In 2012, she published an eBook about Canadian serial killer Karla Homolka. She has also published several other books, including Extreme Mean: Trolls, Bullies and Predators Online in 2014, and Extreme Mean: Ending Cyberabuse at School, Work & Home in 2015. The book was a shortlisted nominee for the 2014 Hilary Weston Writers' Trust Prize for Nonfiction and the 2015 Arthur Ellis Award for Best Crime Nonfiction.

Education
Todd graduated from York University with a Bachelor of Arts in English in 1982, and a Bachelor of Laws (LL.B.) from Osgoode Hall Law School in 1988. She was called to the bar of the Law Society of Upper Canada (now known as Law Society of Ontario) in 1990. As of 2019, she is licensed, non-practicing lawyer in good standing with the Law Society of Ontario.

Career
Soon after graduating in 1982, she was hired by the Toronto Star, where she worked as a reporter, feature writer, and political correspondent. During her last four years at the Toronto Star, she also served as an editorial writer and a member of the newspaper's editorial board.

In 1996, she was hired by TVOntario, where she and Steve Paikin co-hosted the nightly newsmagazine Studio 2 for 10 years. She also hosted and co-produced Person 2 Person with Paula Todd, an interview program first broadcast in 2000. She was hired by CTV News Channel, where she did investigative reporting and hosted The Verdict with Paula Todd, a prime-time legal and justice affairs program. The debut episode of The Verdict was broadcast from Chicagoon 15 March 2007 and covered United States v. Black, the criminal fraud trial of Conrad Black. Todd also worked as an investigative reporter for W5 on CTV News.

Todd has written for numerous publications, including The Globe and Mail, the Toronto Star, Maclean's, Canadian Living and Law Times.

Todd served as a judge for the National Newspaper Awards, the Advancing Canadian Entrepreneurship (ACE) Awards, is a National Magazine Award nominee, and won the Paramedic Association's Media Award for public education. She is a literacy advocate, and served on the Board of Directors of Integra, an organization that assists children and teens with learning disabilities, a cause she supports.

She served on the board of Canadian Journalists for Free Expression, and is the author of the book A Quiet Courage: Inspiring Stories from All of Us which was published in 2004. It was based on Person 2 Person.

A frequent contributor to radio and television before joining TVO, Todd was a regular host on CBC Newsworld's Face Off, appeared as a frequent Global TV and CBC panelist, and also as a political analyst for CBC Radio in Toronto and Ottawa. Her contract with CTV News began on 1 March 2007.

Writing
In 2012, Todd wrote a book chronicling her search for and eventual discovery of Karla Homolka several years after Homolka had been released from prison.

In 2014, Signal Books published Todd's third non-fiction book, Extreme Mean: Ending Cyberabuse at School, Work and Home. Her book was shortlisted by the Hilary Weston Writers' Trust Prize for Nonfiction in 2014 and the Arthur Ellis Award for Best Crime Non-Fiction in 2015.

Works

Notes

References

External links 
 

Living people
Canadian television journalists
Literacy advocates
York University alumni
Year of birth missing (living people)
Osgoode Hall Law School alumni
Lawyers in Ontario
Toronto Star people
CTV Television Network people
Canadian women television journalists
Canadian women lawyers